The 2008 WNBA season was the tenth season for the Minnesota Lynx. The Lynx were not able to return to the postseason for the first time since 2004.

Offseason

Expansion Draft
 Kristen Mann was selected in the 2008 Expansion Draft for the Atlanta Dream.

WNBA Draft

Transactions

Trades

Free agents

Regular season

Season standings

Season schedule

Player stats

Regular season

Minnesota Lynx Regular Season Stats

Roster

Awards and honors
 Seimone Augustus, WNBA Player of the Week (May 26 - June 1)
 Nicky Anosike, WNBA All-Rookie Team (Center)
 Candace Wiggins, WNBA All-Rookie Team (Guard)
 Candice Wiggins, WNBA Sixth Woman of the Year

References

Minnesota Lynx seasons
Minnesota
Minnesota Lynx